New Salisbury may refer to:

New Salisbury, Indiana
New Salisbury, Ohio